The Cypriot national under-17 football team is the national under-17 football team of Cyprus and is controlled by the Cyprus Football Association.

UEFA U-16/U-17 Championship Record
 1982 to 1984: Did not enter
 1985 to 1989: Did not qualify
 1990: Group Stage
 1991: Did not qualify
 1992: Group Stage
 1993 to 2001: Did not qualify
 2002 to 2005: Qualifying Round
 2006: Elite Round
 2007 to 2015: Qualifying Round
 2016: Qualifying Round
 2017 to 2018: Elite Round
 2019: Qualifying Round
 2020 and 2021: Cancelled
 2022:Did not qualify
 2023: To be determined
 2024: Qualified as hosts

FIFA U-17 World Cup Record
 1985 to 2019: Did not qualify
 2021: Cancelled
 2023: To be determined

Current squad
 The following players were called up for the 2023 UEFA European Under-17 Championship qualification matches.
 Match dates: 1 and 7 November 2022
 Opposition: vs.  and 
Caps and goals correct as of: 6 September 2022, after the match against

See also
 Cyprus national football team
 Cyprus national under-21 football team
 Cyprus national under-19 football team
 UEFA European Under-17 Championship

References

External links
 U17 - Cyprus Football Association Official Page
 UEFA.com - Cyprus U17 National Team

European national under-17 association football teams
under-17